Homeobox protein MOX-2 is a protein that in humans is encoded by the MEOX2 gene.

Function 

This gene encodes a member of a subfamily of non-clustered, diverged, antennapedia-like homeobox-containing genes. The encoded protein may play a role in the regulation of vertebrate limb myogenesis. Mutations in the related mouse protein may be associated with craniofacial and/or skeletal abnormalities, in addition to neurovascular dysfunction observed in Alzheimer's disease.

Interactions 

MEOX2 has been shown to interact with PAX1 and PAX3.

References

Further reading

External links 
 

Transcription factors